Jeffrey Thomas "Jeff" Pardo (born December 18, 1981) is an American Christian musician, who is mainly a music producer, songwriter, and composer. He has received a Grammy Award nomination at the 55th Annual Grammy Awards.

Early life
Pardo was born, Jeffrey Thomas Pardo, on December 18, 1981, in Chicago, Illinois. He relocated to Nashville to become a musician.

Music career
His music production songwriting career began about 2003 and he was nominated for a Grammy Award at the 55th Annual Grammy Awards in the Best Contemporary Christian Music Song category. He was a co-writer with Rhett Walker Band's Rhett Walker Canipe on the single, "When Mercy Found Me".

Awards and nominations

GMA Dove Awards

!
|-
| rowspan="9" | 2022
| "Come What May"
| Song of the Year
| 
| rowspan="9" | 
|-
| rowspan="2" | "My Jesus"
| Song of the Year
| 
|-
| Pop/Contemporary Recorded Song of the Year
| 
|-
| "In Jesus Name (God of Possible)"
| Pop/Contemporary Recorded Song of the Year
| 
|-
| Jeff Pardo
| Producer of the Year
| 
|-
| My Jesus
| rowspan="2" | Pop/Contemporary Album of the Year
| 
|-
| Rise Up
| 
|-
| "God Is Good"
| Inspirational Recorded Song of the Year
| 
|-
| | "Mamas"
| Bluegrass/Country/Roots Recorded Song of the Year
| 
|-
|}

Grammy Awards 

!
|-
| 2013
| "When Mercy Found Me"
| Best Contemporary Christian Music Song
| 
| 
|-
|}

Notes

References

External links
 Twitter account

1981 births
Living people
American performers of Christian music
Record producers from Illinois
Musicians from Chicago
Musicians from Nashville, Tennessee
Songwriters from Illinois
Songwriters from Tennessee
People from Chicago